Jean-Louis Pestel was a French ship builder and naval architect active in the late 18th and early 19th centuries. He was the older brother of François Pestel, who was also a ship builder and naval architect. Vessels Jean-Louis Pestel built or designed include:

 was a corvette launched in 1793 that the Royal Navy captured in 1798. The British named her HMS Aventurier and disposed of her in 1802.
 was launched in 1794 and condemned in 1807. She then served as a prison hulk in 1806.
 was a  launched in 1795 and broken up in 1815.
Merveilleuse was a 27-ton (French; "of load") privateer schooner from Honfleur, commissioned in 1798. His Majesty's hired armed ship  captured her on 7 April 1798.
 was a  launched at Honfleur in 1804 that the Dutch seized at Antwerp in May 1814 and condemned.
 was a  launched at Honfleur in 1804 that the Dutch seized in May 1814 in the Scheld, renamed and Bruinvisch in May 1815, and sold for breaking up in 1822.

Citations and references
Citations

References
 
  
 

French naval architects